This articles lists the islands of County Mayo, the mainland of which is part of the island of Ireland. Included in this list are named offshore and freshwater islands as recorded by Ordnance Survey Ireland or the Placenames Database of Ireland. Additionally, areas of ecological significance related to both offshore and freshwater islands, designated by the National Parks and Wildlife Service, are also listed.

Although County Mayo has hundreds of offshore and freshwater islands, only a handful of islands and island groups are large enough to be distinguishable on a typical map of the county, namely Achill Island, Clare Island and Inishturk, along with the island clusters of Duvillaun, Inishkea, Clew Bay and the major loughs.

The geology and geomorphology of the county and its islands is among the most varied and complex in Ireland. Islands such as those at Clew Bay are low-lying, formed when rising sea levels drowned a vast field of drumlins, while others like Clare Island and Achill are characterised by mountains and towering sea-cliffs, of which Croaghaun are the third-highest in Europe, at 

The bedrock geology of the islands is broadly divided into two groups. Those north of Clew Bay such as Achill and the islands off the Mullet Peninsula are generally of ancient Dalradian age, similar to Donegal and the Grampian Highlands. Inishglora contains some of the oldest rocks in Ireland, at 1.75 billion years old. Further south, the islands are much more diverse. Clare island alone is composed of Cambrian, Ordovician, Silurian and Carboniferous terranes sutured together. Geologically, the Clew Bay islands themselves are the youngest in the county, formed during the Lower Carboniferous about 350 million years ago.

The county's offshore islands - and islands off the west coast of Ireland generally - developed their own distinct culture and traditions stretching back centuries. Records from the 1841 Census show that 47 of County Mayo's offshore islands were inhabited, with a combined population of approximately 10,000. The Great Famine resulted in widespread or total depopulation of the islands. Towards the end of the 19th century the population of the larger islands began to recover somewhat, only to be set back by emigration following independence as the Irish government initially encouraged the evacuation of the islands due to the cost of providing services to them, further hastening the decline.

Today, the islands are recognised by the State as an integral part of Ireland's national heritage, preserving the remnants of a unique aspect of Irish culture. The remaining inhabited islands receive support and funding through the Department of Culture, Heritage and the Gaeltacht. As of the 2016 Census, there are 2,700 people living on 14 of the county's offshore islands (of which 2,440 live on Achill), accounting for 1.87% of the county's population.

Islands of Mayo by population

Demographics
The 2016 census records 14 offshore islands as having a usually resident population. Achill has been connected to the mainland via bridge since 1887, making Clare Island the county's most populous unconnected island, with 159 inhabitants as of 2016. This makes Clare Island the fifth-most populous unconnected island in Ireland, after the three Aran Islands off Galway and Arranmore off Donegal.

Mayo County Council is responsible for the governance of the islands, and islanders are entitled to certain benefits and exemptions, such as lower motor tax rates. The islands also receive funding from the Department of Culture, Heritage and the Gaeltacht, as several offshore islands along with much of northwest Mayo are recognised Gaeltacht areas. 

As many as 47 offshore islands had permanent populations prior to the Great Famine. Communities had resided on these islands for generations, and their remains can still be seen to this day through the villages, stone walls and lazybeds which they left behind. By the end of the 19th century most of the county's islands had been deserted. In contrast, Achill benefitted from a bridge to the mainland which allowed the population to temporarily rebound, reaching its all-time peak in 1911.

Emigration from the islands continued into the 20th-century as traditional industries such as fishing and textiles were unable to provide an attractive, or in many cases adequate, income to young islanders. In recent times, the islands have become a popular tourist destination and depend heavily on the tourism and hospitality sector. Their population swells during the summer months, particularly on Achill and Clare. Popular activities include surfing, sailing, island-hopping in Clew Bay, spiritual retreats and eco-tourism.

The following table shows population trends for the fourteen currently inhabited islands as of the last census. The overall trend is a continuing decline in the population of Mayo's offshore islands, which is currently at a historic low. The county as a whole was one of just three in Ireland to record a population decrease between 2011 and 2016. The population of Mayo during this time decreased by 0.2%, whereas the population of the islands fell by 5.3%. Although the overall population fell during this time, four previously uninhabited islands received new residents, including Achillbeg, which had been uninhabited since 1965.

Currently inhabited islands

Formerly inhabited islands

Islands of Mayo by area

Larger islands

The one hundred largest islands in the county are listed below. "F" designates a freshwater island.

Smaller offshore islands
County Mayo has hundreds of smaller islands and islets. Most of the county's offshore islands are located in Clew Bay, with smaller clusters located around the Achill archipelago, the west and south coasts of the Mullet Peninsula, and Blacksod Bay. The list below is not exhaustive, and includes named offshore islands that are either extensive (typically greater than 2 acres in area) or in someway locally significant or identifiable.

Unlike the above list, this list is in alphabetical order and does not include freshwater islands.

Freshwater islands

There are numerous large loughs within the county, containing hundreds of small freshwater islands. Lough Mask in southern Mayo is the largest lough in the county. At  it is the 6th-largest lough in Ireland (as well as the 6th-largest in Britain and Ireland). Further south, Lough Corrib is the 2nd-largest lough in Ireland; however, only a small portion of this lough is located within the county.

Freshwater islands have played an important role in the county's history and host an abundance of castles, monasteries, church ruins and unspoiled woodlands.

Lough Mask

Note: The vast majority of Lough Mask is within County Mayo, with a small southern portion of the lough located in County Galway. This list only includes islands which are within the boundary of County Mayo.

Aghinish
Bed Island
Bilberry Island
Black Island
Black Island
Board Island
Carrigeen Island
Carrigeen Middle
Carrigeenabreana
Carrigeenagur Island
Carrigeenamore
Carrigeenavilla
Carrigeenaweelaun
Carrigeenbaun
Carrigeenbunnahown
Carrigeendany Islands
Carrigeenduree
Carrigeenfair Island
Carrigeenkeelagh
Carrigeenmauntrasna
Carrigeennagool
Carrigeennalogh
Carrigeennasassonagh
Carrigeenowen
Carrigeenshangorman
Castle Hag
Cow Island
Dash Island
Devenish Island
Doran Islands
Goat Island
Green Island
Gull Island
Flag Island
Heath Island
Illan Columbkille
Illanboe Beg
Illanboe More
Illandawaur
Ingon Island
Inishangan
Inishdurra
Inishgleasty
Inishoght
Inishowenlackboy
Inishrobe
Kid Island
Lackboy
Lamb Island
Long Island
Long Islands
Lusteen Beg
Lusteen More
Nut Island
Oak Island
Pig Island
Rams Island
Rialisk
Ringolden
River Island
Saints Island
Seerillaun
Shangorman
Shrub Island
Thick Island
Whiteland Island

Lough Carra

Ballycally Island
Bird Island
Bonnianillish Island
Bush Island
Carrigeennagat Island
Castle Island
Castlehag Island
Church Island
Conors Island
Cow Islands
Crane Island
Creevagh Island
Deer Island
Derrinrush Island
Derrynafresha Island
Doonbeg Island North
Doonbeg Island South
Gleneary Island
Hog Island
Horse Island
Illanatrim
Kiln Island
Lady's Island
Lakeview Island
Leamnahye Island
Long Island
Mearing Island
Otter Island
Otter Island
Otter Islands
Pleasure Island
Priest Island
Rat Island
Stare Island
Stony Island

Lough Corrib
Note: The vast majority of Lough Corrib is within County Galway, with a small northern portion of the lough located in County Mayo. This list only includes islands which are within the boundary of County Mayo.

Abbots Rock
Ballycurrin Island
Bartragh Island
Bertragh Islands
Blackderry Island
Blackderry Rock
Bushy Island
Camillaun
Carrigeen
Castletown Rock
Cornelian Islands
Crow Islands
Dog Islands
Easter Island
Flower Island
Gibbs Islands
Grass Island
Green Island
Green Island East
Holy Island
Inishkeeragh Island
Island Morris
Kilmore
Kilmorebeg
Matthew Island
Mine Island
Mucky Island
Oak Island
Prison Islands
Rabbit Island
Red Island
Salmon Island
Salmon Point Island
Sloe Island
Whiskey Island

Lough Conn

Annagh Island
Annaghroe Island
Annaghteige Island
Bears Island
Burnt Island
Carnaweelan Island
Castle Island
Chain Island
Cliff Island
Coarse Island
Cragh Islands
Creeve Island
Freaghillan
Illanaghty
Illanaloughaun
Illanbeg
Illannaglashy
Inishlee Island
Longford Island
Loosky Island
Rinard Island
Rocky Island
Roe Island
Sandy Island

Smaller lakes

Lough Cullin
Griffins Island
Illanboy
Illaner
Illangub
Illanneill
Illanulque

Lough Beltra
Bush Island
Coarse Island
Islandmore
Low Island
Tree Island

Carrowmore Lake
Atlavally Island
Derreens Island
Gortmore Island
Muingerroon Island

Furnace Lough
Illanroe
Inishower
Saints Island

Islandeady Lough
Note: Despite being a small lough, Islandeady had three sizeable islands, at 38, 21 and 20 acres respectively. However, due to the lowering of waterlevels in the 20th century the three islands are now peninsulas. 
Illanlteige East
Illanteige West
Islandeady

Monastic islands

Six islands within County Mayo have had a dedicated monastery or abbey established on them. Four of these are offshore, and two of these are freshwater islands. They are listed below:

 Church Island Monastery (F)
 Clare Island Abbey
 Duvillaun Monastery
 Inishkea North Monastery
 Inishglora Monastery
 Partry Monastery (F)

In addition to the above sites, many more islands within the county have been used for religious purposes. The ruins of old churches and cemeteries can be found scattered across such islands.

Biodiversity
Many of the county's offshore and freshwater islands are designated as areas of ecological significance and are protected both at national and European level. Mayo's offshore islands are a haven for wildlife and biodiversity, supporting hundreds of species of bird, fish and marine mammal, as well as unique vegetation. Five of the county's major inland lakes (along with their islands) are also protected, those being Lough Mask, Lough Conn, Lough Cullin, Lough Carra and Carrowmore Lake.

The biodiversity of the islands is protected under the following designations. There is overlap across designations, as different designations apply to different species, e.g. the Duvillaun Islands are an SAC, SPA and proposed NHA. 
 Special Area of Conservation (SAC) - These are prime wildlife conservation areas in the country, considered to be important on a European as well as Irish level.
 Special Protection Area (SPA) - Classified under the EU Birds Directive for the protection of endangered species of wild birds.
 Natural Heritage Area (NHA) - This is an area considered important for the habitats present or which holds species of plants and animals whose habitat needs protection.

The following areas of ecological significance are located either on or adjacent to County Mayo's offshore islands. The five major inland lakes listed as SPAs are also included, and are shown in italics in the list below.

Special areas of conservation

Mullet/Blacksod Bay Complex
West Connacht Coast
Erris Head
Inishkea Islands 
Duvillaun Islands
Broadhaven Bay
Killala Bay/Moy Estuary
Croaghaun/Slievemore
Achill Head
Keel Machair/Menaun Cliffs
Doogort Machair/Lough Doo
Clew Bay Complex
Corraun Plateau
Lough Gall Bog
Clare Island Cliffs

Special protection areas
Italics indicates that the SPA is an inland lake
Blacksod Bay/Broadhaven Bay
Inishglora and Inishkeeragh 
Inishkea Islands
Duvillaun Islands
Stags of Broad Haven
Illanmaster
Killala Bay/Moy Estuary 
Doogort Machair
Bills Rocks 
Clare Island
Mullet Peninsula
Termoncarragh Lake & Annagh Machair
Lough Mask
Lough Conn & Lough Cullin 
Lough Carra
Carrowmore Lake

Natural heritage areas
 Tullaghan Bay & Bog
 Doogort East Bog
 Sraheens Bog

Proposed natural heritage areas
Killala Bay/Moy Estuary
Glenamoy Bog Complex
Stags Of Broadhaven
Broadhaven Bay
Erris Head
Eagle Island
Mullet/Blacksod Bay Complex
Inishglora & Inishkeeragh
Inishkea Islands
Duvillaun Islands
Croaghaun/Slievemore
Doogort Machair/Lough Doo
Inishgalloon
Keel Machair/Menaun Cliffs
Corraun Plateau
Lough Gall Bog
Bills Rocks
Clare Island
Clew Bay Complex
Mweelaun Island
Caher Island
Ballybeg Island
Inishturk
Inishdalla
Frehill Island
Inishdegil Islands

Island index

Notes

References

See also
List of loughs of County Mayo
List of mountains and hills of County Mayo

Islands of County Mayo
Gaeltacht places in County Mayo
Geography of Ireland